All Saints’ Church, Darlaston is a parish church in the Church of England in Darlaston.

History
The first church by George Edmund Street dated from 1872. It was erected as a memorial to Samuel Mills, and lavishly furnished with stained glass windows designed by Edward Burne-Jones. It was destroyed by a bomb in the Second World War on 31 July 1942.

The replacement church was started in 1951 by the architect Richard Twentyman and dedicated on 4 October 1952 by the Bishop of Lichfield.

The east end of the church is dominated by a tapestry designed by Stephen Lee, and the stone reliefs on the main door are by Don Potter.

The church was listed at Grade II by Historic England on 22 February 2016.

Organ
The church is equipped with a pipe organ by John Compton. A specification of the organ can be found on the National Pipe Organ Register.

References

Church of England church buildings in the West Midlands (county)
Churches completed in 1952
Richard Twentyman